Unai Rementería Castro (born 10 August 1999) is a Spanish footballer who plays as a midfielder.

Club career
Born in Bilbao, Biscay, Basque Country, Rementería joined Real Sociedad's youth setup in 2015, after representing Romo FC, Danok Bat CF and Athletic Bilbao. In 2017, after finishing his formation, he was loaned to Tercera División side CD Getxo, but finished the campaign at fellow league team Bermeo FT, also on loan.

In July 2018, Rementería signed for Sodupe UC also in the fourth division, but moved to fellow league team Club Portugalete the following 23 January. On 9 July 2019, he joined SD Amorebieta in Segunda División B.

On 30 June 2020, after being a backup option, Rementería agreed to a contract with Arenas Club de Getxo, also in the third level. On 31 May of the following year, he signed a three-year deal with Segunda División side CD Mirandés.

Rementería made his professional debut on 16 August 2021, starting in a 0–0 away draw against Málaga CF. The following 27 January, after featuring sparingly, he was loaned to Primera División RFEF side Bilbao Athletic until June.

On 25 August 2022, Rementería terminated his contract with the Jabatos.

References

External links

1999 births
Living people
Footballers from Bilbao
Spanish footballers
Association football midfielders
Segunda División players
Primera Federación players
Segunda División B players
Tercera División players
Real Sociedad footballers
Athletic Bilbao footballers
Bermeo FT footballers
Real Sociedad C footballers
CD Getxo players
Club Portugalete players
SD Amorebieta footballers
Arenas Club de Getxo footballers
CD Mirandés footballers
Bilbao Athletic footballers